16 (Regina) Field Ambulance is a Canadian Forces Primary Reserve medical unit in Regina, Saskatchewan, Canada.

History 
This unit has a long and distinguished history that lives up to the Medical Branch's tradition of being faithful in adversity. It is the latest in a line of Saskatchewan army medical units dating back to 21 Field Ambulance of World War I and 10 Field Ambulance of World War II.

World War II 
From 1940 to 1941, the unit trained at Camp Dundurn, in preparation for deployment to England. Once deployed, the unit provided medical services, as well as successfully evacuating thousands of Canadian and Allied units.

Post-World War II to 1990 
In the early 1970s, the unit was disbanded along with all militia medical units across Canada, but was reformed as a Medical Company, as part of 16 Service Battalion, a combat service support unit, based out of Regina Garrison in Regina, Saskatchewan.

1990–present 
In the early 1990s, the unit received official detachment status for its detachment operating in Saskatoon, Saskatchewan, out of Sgt. Hugh Cairns VC Armoury. In 2004, the Canadian Forces Medical Service underwent a reorganization, and 16 Medical Company became its own unit again, and was renamed 16 (Regina) Field Ambulance.

Royal Canadian Army Cadets 
16 (Regina) Field Ambulance is affiliated with 328 Royal Canadian Army Medical Cadet Corps, based in Saskatoon.

References

External links 
 16 (Regina) Field Ambulance Official Website
 CFMS History/Heritage Page
 Canadian Forces Medical Service : Introduction to its History and Heritage
 Canadian War Museum

Medical units and formations of Canada
Military units and formations established in 2004
Organizations based in Regina, Saskatchewan
2004 establishments in Saskatchewan